Shane Yellowbird (July 7, 1979April 25, 2022) was a Canadian country music singer-songwriter from Hobbema, Alberta. A Cree, in 2007, he was named the Aboriginal Entertainer of the Year at the Aboriginal People's Choice Music Awards, Chevy Trucks' Rising Star of the Year at the Canadian Country Music Awards and his song "Pickup Truck" was one of the year's ten most played country songs.

Early life
Yellowbird was born in Hobbema, Alberta, on 7 July 1979. He attended Ponoka Composite High School. He first began singing while in speech therapy to treat his severe stuttering.

Career
Yellowbird was signed by O'Reilly International in 2003.  Three years later, he released his debut album titled Life Is Calling My Name. The album includes the singles "Beautiful Concept," "They're All About You," "Pickup Truck" and "I Remember the Music." In November 2006, Yellowbird won three awards at the Aboriginal People's Choice Music Awards ceremony, including Best New Artist, Single of the Year ("Beautiful Concept") and Best Video ("Beautiful Concept").

Yellowbird opened for Emerson Drive on their cross-Canada tour, and was chosen to represent his native Canada by performing at the Fourth Annual Global Artist Party at the CMA Music Festival in June 2007. Yellowbird was named the Chevy Trucks Rising Star of the Year at the 2007 Canadian Country Music Awards.

"Pickup Truck," Yellowbird's third single, also became his first Top 5 song on the Canadian Country Singles chart in the summer of 2007. The song also peaked at No. 64 on the all-genre Canadian Hot 100, while the video topped the CMT Chevy Top 20 in July. It was one of the ten most played country music songs of the year in Canada. Yellowbird opened the 2007 Aboriginal People's Choice Music Awards, starring with Lorne Cardinal and Gabrielle Miller of Corner Gas. Later that evening, he was named the Aboriginal Entertainer of the Year. He also won awards for Best Country CD (Life Is Calling My Name) and Best Music Video ("Pickup Truck").  Yellowbird later won three trophies at the 2007 Canadian Aboriginal Music Awards, including Best Male Artist, Best Country Album and Best Album of the Year (Life Is Calling My Name).  He was also nominated for the 2008 Juno Award for Country Recording of the Year, for Life Is Calling My Name.

Yellowbird's second album, It's About Time was released on November 17, 2009, featuring the single, "Bare Feet on the Blacktop".  In the United States, the video received a nomination from the Native American Music Association.  Yellowbird won two Native American Music Awards for Best Country Recording for "Life Is Calling My Name" in 2011 and won Best Country Recording for "It's About Time" in 2012.

Personal life
At the time of his death, Yellowbird was in a domestic partnership with fiancée Sarah Garrow. The couple announced their engagement hours before his death was announced. He had four children. He suffered from epilepsy and had occasional seizures.

Yellowbird died on April 25, 2022, in Calgary.  He was 42 years old.

Discography

Studio albums

Singles

Music videos

Awards and nominations

References

External links
 
 

1979 births
2022 deaths
Canadian Country Music Association Rising Star Award winners
Canadian country singer-songwriters
Canadian male singer-songwriters
Cree people
First Nations musicians
Musicians from Alberta
People from Ponoka County
21st-century Canadian male singers
306 Records artists
People with epilepsy